Akademija (formerly ) is a town in the Kėdainiai district municipality, in Kaunas County, central Lithuania. It lies on the left bank of the Dotnuvėlė river. According to the 2011 census, the village had a population of 752.
The Lithuanian Research Centre for Agriculture and Forestry is located here. In 2018 the centre employed a total staff of 545, including 187 researchers. It had 56 doctoral students. There is Dotnuva manor and large park in Akademija.

History 
A school dedicated to agriculture and forestry was opened on the estate of Pyotr Stolypin in 1919. In 1922 the first plant breeding station in Lithuania was established here by Dionizas Rudzinskas. In 1923 a field trial station was also set up. An agriculture academy operated here from 1924 to 1945. In 1944 the academy's main hall was exploded by the German forces and as a result in 1946 the academy was moved to Kaunas. In 1956 the Lithuanian agriculture institute was moved here from Vilnius and in 2010 it was renamed to The Lithuanian Research Centre for Agriculture and Forestry.

Demography

References

Towns in Lithuania
Towns in Kaunas County
Kėdainiai District Municipality